Galor or Gal-Or is a surname. Notable people with the surname include:
Oded Galor (born 1953), Israeli-American economist and academic
Amir Gal-Or (born 1962), Israeli entrepreneur
Katharina Galor (born 1966), German-born Israeli archaeologist
Raz Gal-Or (born 1994), Israeli businessperson active in China, son of Amir Gal-Or